Gyeongju is a 2014 South Korean romantic comedy film written and directed by Zhang Lu, starring Park Hae-il and Shin Min-ah.

Plot
Choi Hyeon visits Korea to pay his respects to his recently deceased friend Kim Chang-hee. He sees his other friend Kang. Hyeon is a history professor by profession in China but people often mistake him for a weirdo. When people try to connect with him he snubs them, but maintains an outwardly close relation. After paying his respects he roams around Gyeongju, capital of the Silla Kingdom, and now famous for only tombs and tumuli. He visits a teahouse that he, Kim and Kang visited seven years ago. Hyeon gets curious about an erotic piece of art that vanished which was displayed there and shows interest in the current owner of the joint, Gong Yun-hee. They further start to spend the day together. She invites him to her bed but he is preoccupied with his thoughts and the picture. He leaves in the morning and knows that some people whom he saw yesterday have died. He wanders more. In the next morning at the teahouse Gong Yun-hee is seen curious about the erotic art which she has covered with wallpaper after acquiring the joint. A flashback is shown where Hyeon and his friends sit around the teahouse table and comment on the erotic poetry painting with the writing "Lets have a drink and then each other". Kim Chang-hee's current widowed wife appears to be the previous owner of the teahouse.

Cast
Park Hae-il as Choi Hyeon
Shin Min-ah as Gong Yoon-hee 
Yoon Jin-seo as Yeo-jeong
Kim Tae-hoon as Detective Lee Young-min
Kwak Ja-hyeong as Lee Choon-won
Shin So-yul as Da-yeon 
Baik Hyun-jhin as Professor Park
Ryoo Seung-wan as Teacher Kang 
 Lee Na-ra as Kim Chang-hee's wife
Jeong In-seon as young receptionist
Lee Hyeon-jeong as mother
Kim Soo-ahn as little kid
Kim Hak-sun as Kim Chang-hee

Awards and nominations

References

External links

South Korean romantic comedy-drama films
2014 films
Films directed by Zhang Lu
2014 romantic comedy-drama films
2014 comedy films
2010s South Korean films